James Hill (died June 12, 1903) was a Republican politician and government official in Mississippi. He served in the Mississippi House of Representatives, including as Sergeant at Arms and as Speaker, and was Secretary of State of Mississippi during the Reconstruction era. He served as Secretary of State of Mississippi from January 4, 1874, until January 1878. He was the last African American to hold statewide office in Mississippi. He was one of several African Americans who served as Mississippi Secretary of State during the Reconstruction era.

He was born in Marshall County, Mississippi in the late 1830s. Hill was a slave owned by James Hill and was described as being a light mulatto. He apprenticed as a machinist and became a "first-class mechanic".

After his time as Secretary of State he served as postmaster and collector of internal revenues; he also campaigned for a congressional seat. He never married.

Around February 1903 he started a weekly paper called the Mississippi State Register aimed at both blacks and whites and to be an "olive branch of peace".

He died suddenly June 12, 1903 from heart disease aged 65. A statue of him is at Mount Olive Cemetery in Jackson, Mississippi. An elementary school was named for him and later became Jim Hill High School.

References

1830s births
1903 deaths
19th-century American politicians
African-American politicians during the Reconstruction Era
African-American people in Mississippi politics
Mississippi postmasters
19th-century American slaves
Members of the Mississippi House of Representatives
Mississippi lawyers
Secretaries of State of Mississippi
Speakers of the Mississippi House of Representatives
20th-century African-American people